Pedro Javier Acosta Sánchez (born 28 November 1959) is a Venezuelan football manager and former player who played as a defender.

Club career
Acosta played for Deportivo Galicia, C.S. Marítimo de Venezuela and Caracas F.C.

International career
Acosta made 34 appearances for the senior Venezuela national football team from 1979 to 1989, including participation at the 1979 Copa América, 1983 Copa América, 1987 Copa América and 1989 Copa América.

He also competed for Venezuela at the 1980 Summer Olympics in Moscow, Soviet Union, where the team was eliminated after the preliminary round.

References

1959 births
Living people
Venezuelan footballers
Venezuela international footballers
Footballers at the 1980 Summer Olympics
Olympic footballers of Venezuela
1979 Copa América players
1983 Copa América players
1987 Copa América players
1989 Copa América players
Portuguesa F.C. players
C.S. Marítimo de Venezuela players
Caracas FC players
Association football defenders
Venezuelan football managers
Venezuelan Primera División managers
Deportivo La Guaira managers
Universidad Central de Venezuela F.C. managers